The 2005–06 A-League season was the first for the newly branded Newcastle United Jets. The Jets finished 4th at the conclusion of the regular season and were knocked out in the semi finals by Adelaide United after a two-leg home and away series.

Players

First team squad

Transfers

In

Matches

2005–06 Pre-Season Cup

2005–06 Hyundai A-League fixtures

2005–06 finals series

Ladder

Statistics

Goal scorers

Newcastle Jets FC seasons
Newcastle Jets Season, 2005-06